Chaetodiadema is a genus of sea urchins of the Family Diadematidae. Their armour is covered with spines.

List of species 
Following World Register of Marine Species: 
 Chaetodiadema africanum H.L. Clark, 1924 -- South Africa
 Chaetodiadema granulatum Mortensen, 1903 -- Indo-west Pacific
 Chaetodiadema japonicum Mortensen, 1904 -- Japan
 Chaetodiadema keiense Mortensen, 1939 -- Kei islands
 Chaetodiadema pallidum A. Agassiz & H.L. Clark, 1907 -- Hawaii
 Chaetodiadema tuberculatum H.L. Clark, 1909 -- South Australia

References 

Animals described in 1903
Diadematidae